Henry McGill Kinghorn (1886–1955) was a Scottish football goalkeeper and manager.

Playing career
Born in Midlothian, Kinghorn began his career with Arniston Rangers before going on to appear for Alloa Athletic and Scottish Football League side Leith Athletic. He transferred to English Football League club Sheffield Wednesday for the 1908-09 season but failed to establish himself as first choice, making 25 league appearances with the club in three seasons.

Bournemouth
In 1923 he succeeded Vincent Kitcher as manager of Bournemouth & Boscombe Athletic F.C., a position he held until being replaced by Leslie Knighton in 1925. During the 1928-29 season Kinghorn played once for Bournemouth in the Football League. Kinghorn returned to the manager's chair in 1939 when Charlie Bell left and remained in charge until 1947 when Harry Lowe took over.

External links

References

1886 births
1955 deaths
Sportspeople from Midlothian
Scottish footballers
Arniston Rangers F.C. players
Alloa Athletic F.C. players
Leith Athletic F.C. players
Sheffield Wednesday F.C. players
Scottish Football League players
English Football League players
AFC Bournemouth players
Scottish football managers
AFC Bournemouth managers
Association football goalkeepers